Krakor Airport  is a public use airport located near Krakor, Poŭthĭsăt, Cambodia.

See also
List of airports in Cambodia

References

External links 
 Airport record for Krakor Airport at Landings.com

Airports in Cambodia
Buildings and structures in Pursat province